Penkule Parish is an administrative unit of Dobele Municipality, Latvia.

Towns, villages and settlements of Penkule Parish 
Penkule
Baldonas
Ezeriņi
Skujaine

References 

Dobele Municipality
Parishes of Latvia